Jorge Homero Yunda Machado (born 28 August 1965) is an Ecuadorian politician, physician, musician and radio broadcaster. He is a member of the PAIS Alliance. Metropolitan Mayor of Quito from 2019 until 2021. From 2017 until 2018, he served as a member of the National Assembly.

References

Living people
1965 births
21st-century Ecuadorian politicians
PAIS Alliance politicians
Mayors of Quito
Members of the National Assembly (Ecuador)
People from Chimborazo Province